Nikita Kaplenko (born 18 September 1995) is a Belarusian professional footballer who plays for Shakhtyor Soligorsk.

Honours
Belarusian Super Cup winner: 2023

Personal life
His younger brother Kirill Kaplenko is also a footballer.

References

External links 
 
 

1995 births
Living people
Belarusian footballers
Association football midfielders
FC Dinamo Minsk players
FC Bereza-2010 players
FC Torpedo-BelAZ Zhodino players
FC Chayka Peschanokopskoye players
FC Volgar Astrakhan players
FC Shakhtyor Soligorsk players
Belarusian First League
Belarusian Premier League
Russian First League players
Belarusian expatriate footballers
Expatriate footballers in Russia
Belarusian expatriate sportspeople in Russia